Tephrelalis sexincisa is a species of tephritid or fruit flies in the genus Tephrelalis of the family Tephritidae.

Distribution
Russia.

References

Tephritinae
Insects described in 1993
Diptera of Asia